Sitthichai Sitsongpeenong (Thai: สิทธิชัย ศิษย์สองพี่น้อง, ; born September 23, 1991) is a Thai Muay Thai kickboxer who is currently signed to ONE Championship. Sitthichai is a former Lumpinee Stadium Welterweight Champion and Glory Lightweight Champion. Combat Press ranks him as the #3 lightweight kickboxer in the world. As of October 27, 2022, he is ranked #3 in the ONE Featherweight Kickboxing rankings and As of March 6, 2023, he is ranked #2 in the ONE Featherweight Muay Thai rankings.

Biography and career

Muay Thai
Sitthichai Sitsongpeenong was born as Anulak Jansuk in Buriram, Thailand on September 23, 1991. He had his first fight at the age of 11 in 2002.

His first fight outside of Thailand was in a 4-man tournament at 63.5 kg at the "Nuit des Titans" event in Tours, France on 30 January 2010. He beat Fabio Pinca by decision in the first fight and Anuwat Kaewsamrit by decision in the final to win the 4-Man Tournament.

His second fight outside of Thailand was at the “La Nuit des Champions” event in Marselle, France on 28 November 2010. He won against Damien Alamos by decision over 5 rounds.

He lost in the final of the “Fuktien Group 8-Man Tournament 8-Man @146 lbs against Iquezang Kor.Rungthanakeat by TKO in the 5th round (broken collarbone) at Omnoi Stadium on 23 July 2011.

His first fight back after recovery from injury 5 months later was at the “A1 - WCC” event in Lyon, France on December 8, 2011, where he beat Fares Bechar by TKO in the fourth round.

Sitthichai went on to win :
 The “Toyota Vigo 8-Man Marathon”  at 147 lbs in Chonburi, Thailand on May 31, 2012.
 The Thailand (PAT) Welterweight Championship Title at 147 lbs against Petchmankong Gaiyang 5 Daow by 5-round decision at Lumpinee Stadium on September 25, 2012
 The “1 - King” 4-Man Tournament at 70 kg against Puengluang Sitpupantu by TKO in the first round in Koh Chang, Thailand on January 5, 2013.
A rematch between Sitthichai and Fabio Pinca went down at Best of Siam 3 in Paris, France, on February 14, 2013, and he came out on top again, winning a unanimous decision.

He won the “Toyota Vigo 8-Man Tournament” @70 kg against Dechrid Poptheeratham by decision after 3 rounds in Udon Thani on March 29, 2013.

It was reported that he would fight Kamel Jemel at the WBC World Muay Thai Millennium Championship in Saint-Pierre, Réunion on September 7, 2013. However, he denied ever being on the card.

He beat Juri Kehl on points at MAX Muay Thai 2 in Pattaya, Thailand on June 29, 2013. It was a fairly one-sided fight, although Kehl did land a high kick in round two which knocked Sitthichai down. However, the referee counted it as a slip.

He won by decision against Jordan Watson at MAX Muay Thai 3 in Zhengzhou, China on August 10, 2013.

He defended his Thailand (PAT) Welterweight Championship @147 lbs against Dechrid Poptheeratham in Bangkok at November 23, 2013.

He outpointed Wanchalerm Udduonmuang in the main event of Yokkao 6 in Pattaya, Thailand on January 4, 2014.

He took an extension round decision over Chingiz Allazov at Thai Boxe Mania in Turin, Italy on January 25, 2014.

Sitthichai defeated Mohamed Khamal via UD at Legend 3: Pour Homme in Milan, Italy on April 5, 2014.

He knocked out Johann Fauveau in round two at Best of Siam 5 in Paris, France, on June 14, 2014.

He defended his Thailand (PAT) Welterweight Championship @147 lbs and won the Lumpinee Stadium Welterweight Championship @147 lbs against Maruay Sitjaepond at Lumpinee Stadium, Bangkok on October 28, 2014.

His last fight under Muay Thai rules to date was a victory against Crice Bousouko at 70 kg at the La Nuit des Titans 2015 event in Tours, France on February 7, 2015.

Kickboxing
In his first ever fight under kickboxing rules, he lost a highly disputed decision to Enriko Gogokhia on the Oktagon 2013  event that served as the undercard to Glory 7: Milan in Milan, Italy on April 20, 2013. He had initially been set to face Davit Kiria on the main card but was demoted to the prelims when his opponent was changed.

He won the “La Nuit des Champions” 4-Man Tournament (under K-1 rules) event in Marselle, France by defeating Abdellah Ezbiri in the final by TKO in the second round on November 22, 2014.

He won the Fight League - Grand Prix 8-Man tournament 70 kg by defeating Yasssin Baiter by KO in the second round in the Final in Tangier, Morocco on August 8, 2015.

Kunlun Fight
He won his first major tournament under kickboxing rules at the Kunlun Fight 15: The World MAX - Middleweight 4-Man Tournament at 70 kg by defeating Murthel Groenhart by KO in 3 rounds and Andy Souwer by decision in 3 rounds in Nanjing, China on January 3, 2015.

He started fighting exclusively under kickboxing rules at the Kunlun Fight 24 event in Verona, Italy where he lost to Dylan Salvador by decision after three rounds on May 2, 2015.

He won the “2015 Kunlun Fight 70kg World Max Tournament" by defeating Enriko Gogokhia by decision in the 4th extension round at Kunlun Fight 37 in Sanya, China on 23 January, 2016.

He participated in “Kunlun Fight 64-Man 70kg World Max Tournament 2016” and qualified for the Final 16-Man by defeating Walid Hamid by KO in the second round and Mohamed Mezouari by 4th extension round decision in the final at Kunlun Fight 43 in Zhoukou, China on 23 Apr, 2016. He finished as a quarter finalist being defeated by the tournament champion, Superbon Banchamek at Kunlun Fight 53 - World Max Tournament 2016 Final 8 on 24 September 2016 in Beijing, China.

Wu Lin Feng
Sittichai won the 8-man Yi Long Challenge Tournament for the 71 kg title by WLF, held in China. He defeated Hasan Toy, Enriko Kehl and Dzhabar Askerov. In the finals, on November 4, 2017, he fought the then-current champion, Yi Long in the Dragon King Challenge. He won via second round head kick KO to secure the Wu Lin Feng 71kg World Championship.

Glory
In his debut at Glory he won the Lightweight Contender Tournament at 70 kg at Glory 22 in Lille, France on June 5, 2015 by defeating Davit Kiria by TKO in the second round and Josh Jauncey by unanimous decision in the final.

Winning the Glory contender tournament led to a fight with Robin van Roosmalen, which he lost in a highly controversial decision during Glory 25 in Monza, Italy on November 6, 2015.

He competed and won the “Glory Lightweight Contender Tournament” at 70 kg again, defeating Davit Kiria and Marat Grigorian (whom he had beaten previously at Kunlun Fight) at Glory 28 in Paris, France on March 12, 2016.

Glory Lightweight Champion
He won a rematch vs Robin van Roosmalen at Glory 31 on June 25, 2016 in Amsterdam, Netherlands. Which he won by split decision and became the Glory Lightweight Champion at 70 kg.

Sittichai defended his Glory Lightweight title at Glory 39 on March 25, 2017 in Brussels, Belgium against Dylan Salvador. It was the third fight between the two. He won the fight by TKO. 

Sitthichai defended his Glory Lightweight Championship another four times. On February 16, 2018, he defeated Christian Baya by unanimous decision at Glory 50 in Chicago. He outscored Tyjani Beztati to retain the title on May 12, 2018 at Glory 53 in Lille, France. Sitthichai would then face Marat Grigorian in the fourth meeting between the two on August 25, 2018, winning by split decision at Glory 57 in Shenzhen, China. On November 2, 2018, he defeated Josh Jauncey by unanimous decision at Glory 61 in New York City. 

On May 17, 2019, Sitthichai lost the Glory Lightweight Championship to Marat Grigorian by unanimous decision in their fifth meeting at Glory 65 in Utrecht, Netherlands.

ONE Championship
On May 14, 2020, it was announced that Sitthichai had signed with ONE Championship.

Sitthichai was scheduled to make his ONE debut at ONE Championship: No Surrender on July 31, 2020, where was set to face Superbon Banchamek for a third time. Under kickboxing rules, he lost to Superbon by unanimous decision.

Sitthichai is next scheduled to face promotional newcomer Tayfun Özcan at ONE Championship: Battleground on July 30, 2021. After Özcan suffered an injury in training, he was rescheduled to face Tawanchai P.K. Saenchaimuaythaigym under Muay Thai rules at ONE Championship: Battleground 3 on August 27, 2021. Sitthichai defeated Tawanchai by split decision.

ONE Featherweight Kickboxing World Grand Prix
Sitthichai faced Tayfun Özcan in the quarter finals of the 2021 ONE Kickboxing Featherweight World Grand Prix at ONE Championship: First Strike. Sitthichai defeated Özcan by split decision.

Sitthichai was scheduled to face Davit Kiria in the semifinals of the ONE Featherweight Kickboxing World Grand Prix at ONE: Only the Brave on January 28, 2022. Sitthichai won the fight by unanimous decision.

He faced Chingiz Allazov in the ONE Featherweight Kickboxing World Grand Prix Final at ONE: X on March 26, 2022. He lost the fight by unanimous decision.

Sitthichai was booked to face the former Enfusion -67kg champion Mohammed Boutasaa at ONE on Prime Video 3 on October 21, 2022. the fight by unanimous decision.

Titles and achievements

Kickboxing
ONE Championship 
2021 ONE Kickboxing Featherweight World Grand Prix Runner-up  
Glory
2018 Year in Review - Fighter of the Year
2016-2019 Glory Lightweight Champion (one time; six defenses)
2016 Glory Lightweight (-70 kg/154.3 lb) Contender Tournament Winner
2015 Glory Lightweight (-70 kg/154.3 lb) Contender Tournament Winner
Kunlun Fight
2016 Kunlun Fight World Max Group I Tournament Winner
2015 Kunlun Fight World Max Tournament Champion
2015 Kunlun Fight World Max Group A Tournament Winner
Wu Lin Feng
2017 Wu Lin Feng World Championship (-71 kg)
2017 WLF Yi Long Challenge Tournament Winner
The Fight League
2015 The Fight League 8 Man Tournament Champion
Nuit des Champions
2014 NDC K-1 Rules -70 kg Tournament Champion

Muaythai
Lumpinee Stadium
2014 Lumpinee Stadium Welterweight Champion (147 lbs)
Professional Boxing Association of Thailand
2012-2014 Thailand (PAT) Welterweight Champion (147 lbs) 
Toyota Cup
2013 Toyota Vigo Marathon Tournament Champion (154 lbs)
2012 Toyota Vigo Marathon Tournament Champion (147 lbs)
1–King
2013 Champions Club “1–King” 4-Man Tournament Champion (-70 kg)
Fuktien Group
2011 Fuktien Group Tournament Runner Up (147 lbs)
Nuit des Champions
2010 "Nuit des Champions" Muaythai belt (-64 kg)
Nuit des Titans
2010 "Nuit des Titans" 4 Man Muaythai Tournament Champion (140 lbs)

Accomplishments
International Muaythai Ambassador
2015 Sports Writers Association of Thailand - International Muaythai Ambassador 
glorykickboxing.com
2018 Year in Review - Fighter of the Year
CombatPress.com
2017 Knockout of the Year vs. Yi Long on November 4
2015 Fighter of the Year
2019 Fight of the Year vs. Marat Grigorian

BoxeMag.com
2014 BoxeMag Best International Fighter of the Year

Ranking
CombatPress.com
N°1 Combat Press.com at Pound-For-Pound, January 2019
N°1 Combat Press.com at Lightweight (154 lb), January 2019
Liver Kick.com
N°2 Liver Kick.com at Lightweight (154 lb), March 2018

Kickboxing record

|-  style="background:#cfc;"
| 2022-10-22 || Win ||align=left| Mohammed Boutasaa|| ONE on Prime Video 3 || Kuala Lumpur, Malaysia || Decision (Unanimous) || 3 || 3:00 

|- style="background:#fbb;"
| 2022-03-26|| Loss ||align=left| Chingiz Allazov || ONE: X || Kallang, Singapore || Decision (Unanimous) || 3 || 3:00  
|-
! style=background:white colspan=9 |
|-
|- style="background:#cfc;"
| 2022-01-28|| Win ||align=left| Davit Kiria || ONE: Only the Brave || Kallang, Singapore || Decision (Unanimous) || 3 || 3:00  
|-
! style=background:white colspan=9 |
|- style="background:#cfc;"
| 2021-10-15|| Win ||align=left| Tayfun Özcan || ONE: First Strike || Kallang, Singapore || Decision (Split) || 3 || 3:00
|-
! style=background:white colspan=9 |
|-  style="background:#cfc;"
| 2021-08-27|| Win|| align=left|  Tawanchai P.K. Saenchaimuaythaigym || ONE: Battleground 3 || Kallang, Singapore || Decision (Split)  ||3  ||3:00
|-  style="background:#fbb;"
| 2020-07-31|| Loss ||align=left| Superbon Banchamek || ONE: No Surrender || Bangkok, Thailand || Decision (Unanimous) || 3 || 3:00
|- style="background:#cfc;"
| 2019-11-15 || Win ||align=left| Bobirjon Tagaev || Macau Fight 2019 || Macau || Ext.R Decision (Unanimous) || 4 || 3:00
|-
|- style="background:#fbb;"
| 2019-05-17 || Loss ||align=left| Marat Grigorian || Glory 65: Utrecht || Netherlands || Decision (Unanimous) || 5 || 3:00
|-
! style=background:white colspan=9 |
|-  style="background:#cfc;"
| 2018-11-02 || Win ||align=left| Josh Jauncey || Glory 61: New York || New York, United States || Decision (Unanimous) || 5 || 3:00
|-
! style=background:white colspan=9 |
|-
|-  style="background:#cfc;"
| 2018-08-25 || Win ||align=left| Marat Grigorian || Glory 57: Shenzhen || Shenzhen, China || Decision (Split) || 5 || 3:00
|-
! style=background:white colspan=9 |
|-
|-  style="background:#cfc;"
| 2018-05-12 || Win||align=left| Tyjani Beztati || Glory 53: Lille  || Lille, France || Decision (Unanimous) || 5 ||  3:00
|-
! style=background:white colspan=9 |
|- style="background:#cfc;"
| 2018-02-16 || Win || align="left| Christian Baya || Glory 50:Chicago || Chicago, United States ||Decision (unanimous) || 5 || 3:00
|-
! style=background:white colspan=9 |
|- style="background:#cfc;"
| 2017-11-04 || Win || align="left| Yi Long || Wu Lin Feng 2017: Yi Long VS Sitthichai || Kunming, China || KO (Left High Kick) || 2 || 1:10
|-
! style=background:white colspan=9 |
|- style="background:#cfc;"
| 2017-10-07 || Win  || align="left| Dzhabar Askerov || Wu Lin Feng 2017: WLF VS ACB & ACB KB 11 - Yi Long Challeng Tournament Final || Zhengzhou, China || Decision (Unanimous) || 3 || 3:00
|-
! style=background:white colspan=9 |
|-
|- style="background:#cfc;"
| 2017-09-02 || Win  || align="left| Enriko Kehl || Wu Lin Feng - Wu Lin Feng 2017: World Championship Xi'an - Yi Long Challenge Tournament Semi Finals || Xian, China || Decision (Unanimous) || 3 || 3:00
|-
|- style="background:#cfc;"
| 2017-07-01 || Win || align="left| Hasan Toy || Wu Lin Feng 2017: China VS Spain - Yi Long Challenge 1/4 Finals || Zhengzhou, China || Decision (Unanimous) || 3 || 3:00
|-
|-  style="background:#cfc;"
| 2017-03-25 || Win ||align=left| Dylan Salvador || Glory 39: Brussels || Brussels, Belgium || TKO (Knee to the Body) || 4 || 2:58
|-
! style=background:white colspan=9 |
|-  style="background:#cfc;"
| 2016-12-10 || Win ||align=left| Marat Grigorian || Glory 36: Oberhausen || Oberhausen, Germany || Decision (Split) || 5 || 3:00
|-
! style=background:white colspan=9 |
|-
|- style="background:#fbb;"
| 2016-09-24 || Loss ||align=left| Superbon Banchamek || Kunlun Fight 53 - World MAX Tournament 2016 Final 8 || Beijing, China || Decision (Unanimous) || 3 || 3:00
|-
|-  style="background:#cfc;"
| 2016-08-20 || Win ||align=left| Diogo Neves || Kunlun Fight 50 – World MAX Tournament 2016 Final 16 || Jinan, China || Decision (unanimous) || 3 || 3:00
|-
! style=background:white colspan=9 |
|-  style="background:#cfc;"
| 2016-06-25 || Win ||align=left| Robin van Roosmalen || Glory 31: Amsterdam || Amsterdam, Netherlands || Decision (Split) || 5 || 3:00
|-
! style=background:white colspan=9 | 
|-
|-  style="background:#cfc;"
| 2016-04-23 || Win ||align=left| Mohamed Mezouari  || Kunlun Fight 43 – World MAX 2016 Group I Tournament Final || Zhoukou, China || Ext. R Decision (4-1)  || 4 || 3:00
|-
! style=background:white colspan=9 |
|-  style="background:#cfc;"
| 2016-04-23 || Win ||align=left| Walid Hamid || Kunlun Fight 43 – World MAX 2016 Group I Tournament Semi Finals || Zhoukou, China || TKO (Knee to the Body) || 2 || 1:25
|-  style="background:#cfc;"
| 2016-03-12 || Win ||align=left| Marat Grigorian || Glory 28: Paris - Lightweight Contender Tournament, Final || Paris, France || Decision (unanimous) || 3 || 3:00
|-
! style=background:white colspan=9 |
|-  style="background:#cfc;"
| 2016-03-12 || Win ||align=left| Davit Kiria || Glory 28: Paris - Lightweight Contender Tournament, Semi Finals || Paris, France || Decision (unanimous) || 3 || 3:00
|-  style="background:#cfc;"
| 2016-01-23 || Win ||align=left| Enriko Gogokhia || Kunlun Fight 37 - World MAX Tournament 2015, Final || Sanya, China || Ext. R Decision (3-1) || 4 || 3:00
|-  style="background:#cfc;"
|-
! style=background:white colspan=9 | 
|-
|-  bgcolor="CCFFCC"
| 2016-01-23 || Win ||align=left| Superbon Banchamek || Kunlun Fight 37 - World MAX Tournament 2015, Semi Finals || Sanya, China || KO (Right Hook) || 2 || 0:39 
|-  style="background:#cfc;"
| 2015-12-19 || Win ||align=left| Marat Grigorian || Kunlun Fight 35 - World MAX Tournament 2015 Final 8 || Luoyang, China ||  Decision (Majority) || 3 || 3:00 
|-
! style=background:white colspan=9 |
|-
|- style="background:#fbb;"
| 2015-11-06 || Lost ||align=left| Robin van Roosmalen || Glory 25: Milan || Monza, Italy ||  Decision (unanimous)  || 5 || 3:00
|-
! style=background:white colspan=9 | 
|-
|-  bgcolor="CCFFCC"
| 2015-09-28 || Win ||align=left| Jonay Risco || Kunlun Fight 31 - World MAX Tournament 2015 Final 16 || Bangkok, Thailand ||  Decision (unanimous) || 3 || 3:00 
|-
! style=background:white colspan=9 |
|-
|-  style="background:#cfc;"
| 2015-08-08 || Win ||align=left| Yassin Baitar || The Fight League Final (70 kg KB rules)|| Tangier, Morocco || KO (Left Hook)|| 2 || 3:00
|- 
! style=background:white colspan=9 |
|-  style="background:#cfc;"
| 2015-08-08 || Win ||align=left| Walid Hamid || The Fight League Semi Finals (70 kg KB rules)|| Tangier, Morocco || TKO (Cut)|| 2 || 3:00
|-  style="background:#cfc;"
| 2015-08-08 || Win ||align=left| Emad Kedyar || The Fight League Quarter Finals (70 kg KB rules)|| Tangier, Morocco || Decision || 3 || 3:00
|-  style="background:#cfc;"
| 2015-06-05 || Win ||align=left| Josh Jauncey || Glory 22: Lille - Lightweight Contender Tournament, Final || Lille, France || Decision (unanimous) || 3 || 3:00
|-
! style=background:white colspan=9 |
|-  style="background:#cfc;"
| 2015-06-05 || Win ||align=left| Davit Kiria || Glory 22: Lille - Lightweight Contender Tournament, Semi Finals || Lille, France || KO (Knee to the Body) || 2 || 2:09 
|-  style="background:#fbb;"
| 2015-05-02 || Loss ||align=left| Dylan Salvador || Kunlun Fight 24 || Verona, Italy || Decision (unanimous) || 3 || 3:00
|-  style="background:#cfc;"
| 2015-02-07 || Win ||align=left| Crice Boussoukou || La Nuit des Titans 2015 –  70 kg|| Tours, France || Decision || 5 || 3:00
|-  style="background:#cfc;"
| 2015-01-03 || Win ||align=left| Andy Souwer || Kunlun Fight 15 - World MAX 2015 Group A Tournament Final || Nanjing, China || Decision  || 3 || 3:00
|-
! style=background:white colspan=9 |
|-  style="background:#cfc;"
| 2015-01-03 || Win ||align=left| Murthel Groenhart || Kunlun Fight 15 - World MAX 2015 Group A Tournament Semi Finals || Nanjing, China || KO (Left High Kick) || 3 || 2:49 
|-  style="background:#cfc;"
| 2014-12-13 || Win ||align=left| Dylan Salvador || Victory 2, K-1 Rules || Levallois, France ||  Decision || 3 || 3:00
|-  style=|-  style="background:#fbb;"
|-  style="background:#cfc;"
| 2014-11-22 ||Win ||align=left| Abdellah Ezbiri || La 21ème Nuit des Champions, Final || Marseille, France ||  TKO (Left Low Kicks) || 2 || 
|-
! style=background:white colspan=9 |
|-  style="background:#cfc;"
| 2014-11-22 || Win ||align=left| Abdallah Mabel || La 21ème Nuit des Champions, Semi Finals || Marseille, France ||  Decision || 3 || 3:00
|-  style="background:#cfc;"
| 2014-10-28 || Win ||align=left| Sorgraw Petchyindee || Petyindee Fights, Lumpinee Stadium || Bangkok, Thailand || TKO (Referee Stoppage/Left High Kick) || 4 || 
|-
! style=background:white colspan=9 |
|-  style="background:#cfc;"
| 2014-07-06 || Win || style="text-align:left;"| Batyr Ruskorkoloev  || Max Muay Thai 8 || Pattaya, Thailand || TKO (Elbow) || 2 ||  
|-  style="background:#cfc;"
| 2014-06-14 || Win || style="text-align:left;"| Johann Fauveau  || Best of Siam 5 || Paris, France || KO (Left Elbow) || 2 || 
|-  style="background:#cfc;"
| 2014-04-05 || Win ||align=left| Mohamed Khamal || Legend 3: Pour Homme || Milan, Italy || Decision (unanimous) || 3 || 3:00
|-  style="background:#cfc;"
| 2014-01-25 || Win || style="text-align:left;"| Chingiz Allazov || Thai Boxe Mania || Turin, Italy || Ext. R Decision || 4 || 3:00
|-  style="background:#cfc;"
| 2014-01-03 || Win || style="text-align:left;"| Wanchalerm Aooddonmuang|| Yokkao 6 || Pattaya, Thailand || Decision || 3 || 3:00
|-  style="background:#cfc;"
| 2013-12-14 || Win || style="text-align:left;"| Kym Johnson  || Rebellion Muaythai VI || Melbourne, Australia || Decision (Unanimous) || 5 || 3:00
|-  style="background:#cfc;"
| 2013-11-23 || Win ||align=left| Dejrit Poptheeratham || Muay Thai Thailand Welterweight Championship|| Bangkok, Thailand || Decision || 5 || 3:00
|-
! style=background:white colspan=9 |
|-  style="background:#cfc;"
| 2013-09-07 || Win || style="text-align:left;"| Mickael Piscitello  || Millennium Team Fight || La Réunion || KO (Elbow) || 2 || 
|-  style="background:#cfc;"
| 2013-08-10 || Win || style="text-align:left;"| Jordan Watson  || MAX Muay Thai 3 || Zhengzhou, China || Decision || 3 || 3:00
|-  style="background:#cfc;"
| 2013-06-29 || Win ||align=left| Juri Kehl || MAX Muay Thai 2 || Pattaya, Thailand || Decision || 3 || 3:00 
|-  style="background:#fbb;"
| 2013-04-20 || Loss ||align=left| Enriko Gogokhia || Oktagon 2013 || Milan, Italy || Decision (Split) || 3 || 3:00
|-  style="background:#cfc;"
| 2013-03-29 || Win ||align=left| Dejrit Poptheeratham || Toyota Vigo Marathon Tournament 2013, Final || Udon Thani, Thailand || Decision  || 3 || 3:00
|-
! style=background:white colspan=9 |
|-  style="background:#cfc;"
| 2013-03-29 || Win ||align=left| Petchmankong Gaiyanghaadao || Toyota Vigo Marathon Tournament 2013, Semi Final || Udon Thani, Thailand || Decision  || 3 || 3:00
|-  style="background:#cfc;"
| 2013-03-29 || Win ||align=left| Petsanguan Sor Yupinda || Toyota Vigo Marathon Tournament 2013, Quarter Final || Udon Thani, Thailand || KO  || 1 || 
|-  style="background:#cfc;"
| 2013-02-14 || Win ||align=left| Fabio Pinca || Best of Siam 3 || Paris, France || Decision (unanimous) || 5 || 3:00
|-  style="background:#cfc;"
| 2013-01-25 || Win ||align=left| Petchasawin Seatransferry || Muaythai Gala || Ko Samui, Thailand || KO || 2 || 
|-  style="background:#cfc;"
| 2013-01-05 || Win ||align=left| Puengluang Sitpupantu || “1–King”70Kg Tournament, Final || Koh Chang, Thailand || TKO (Referee Stoppage/Left High Kick) || 1 || 1:18
|-
! style=background:white colspan=9 |
|-  style="background:#cfc;"
| 2013-01-05 || Win ||align=left| Sen Bunthen || “1–King”70Kg Tournament, Semi Final || Koh Chang, Thailand || Decision || 3 || 3:00
|-  style="background:#cfc;"
| 2012-09-25 || Win ||align=left| Petchmankong Gaiyanghaadaogym || Petchyindee Fight, Lumpinee Stadium || Bangkok, Thailand || Decision || 5 || 3:00
|-
! style=background:white colspan=9 |
|-  style="background:#cfc;"
| 2012-08-31 || Win ||align=left| Prakaysaeng Gaiyanghaadaogym || Wanweraphon Fight, Lumpinee Stadium || Bangkok, Thailand || Decision || 5 || 3:00
|-  style="background:#cfc;"
| 2012-07-31 || Win ||align=left| Kamlaipetch S. Somnuek || Muaythai Gala || Hua Mak, Thailand || Decision || 3 || 
|-  style="background:#cfc;"
| 2012-06-24 || Win ||align=left| Crice Boussoukou || Channel 11 "Thailand vs. Russia" || Pattaya, Thailand || Decision || 3 || 3:00
|-  style="background:#cfc;"
| 2012-05-31 || Win ||align=left| Pich Seiha || Toyota Vigo Marathon Tournament 2012, Final || Chonburi, Thailand || Decision || 3 || 2:00
|-
! style=background:white colspan=9 |
|-  style="background:#cfc;"
| 2012-05-31 || Win ||align=left| Leo Monteiro || Toyota Vigo Marathon Tournament 2012, Semi Final || Chonburi, Thailand || Decision || 4 || 2:00
|-  style="background:#cfc;"
| 2012-05-31 || Win ||align=left| Leonard Nganga || Toyota Vigo Marathon Tournament 2012, Quarter Final || Chonburi, Thailand || Decision || 3 || 2:00
|-  style="background:#cfc;"
| 2012-04-24 || Win ||align=left| Petasawin Seatransferry || Wanwirapon Fight, Lumpinee Stadium || Bangkok, Thailand || Decision || 5 || 3:00
|-  style="background:#cfc;"
| 2012-01-31 || Win ||align=left| Sirimongkol Sitanupap || Petchyindee Fight, Lumpinee Stadium || Bangkok, Thailand || TKO (Cut) || 4 || 
|-  style="background:#cfc;"
| 2011-12-08 || Win ||align=left| Fares Bechar || A-1 WCC || Lyon, France || TKO || 4 || 
|-  style="background:#fbb;"
| 2011-07-23 || Loss ||align=left| Iquezang Kor.Rungthanakeat || Fuktien Group Tournament, Omnoi Stadium || Bangkok, Thailand || TKO (Broken Collar Bone) || 5 || 
|-
! style=background:white colspan=9 |
|-  style="background:#cfc;"
| 2011-06-18 || Win ||align=left| Samranchai 96 Peenang || Fuktien Group Tournament, Omnoi Stadium || Bangkok, Thailand || Decision || 5 || 3:00
|-  style="background:#cfc;"
| 2011-05-14 || Win ||align=left| Iquezang Kor.Rungthanakeat || Fuktien Group Tournament, Omnoi Stadium || Bangkok, Thailand || Decision || 5 || 3:00
|-  style="background:#cfc;"
| 2011-04-16 || Win ||align=left| Singmanee Kaewsamrit || Fuktien Group Tournament, Omnoi Stadium || Bangkok, Thailand || Decision || 5 || 3:00
|-  style="background:#c5d2ea;"
| 2011-03-12 || Draw ||align=left| Songniyom Pumphanmuang || Fuktien Group Tournament, Omnoi Stadium || Bangkok, Thailand || Draw || 5 || 3:00
|-  style="background:#cfc;"
| 2011-02-04 || Win ||align=left| Petchmankong Kaiyanghadaogym || Petchpiya Fight, Lumpinee Stadium || Bangkok, Thailand || Decision || 5 || 3:00
|-  style="background:#cfc;"
| 2011-01-13 || Win ||align=left| Eakpracha Meenayothin || Wanmitchai Fights, Rajadamnern Stadium || Bangkok, Thailand || Decision || 5 || 3:00
|-  style="background:#cfc;"
| 2010-11-26 || Win ||align=left| Damien Alamos || La Nuit des Champions 2010 || Marseilles, France || Decision || 5 || 3:00
|-
! style=background:white colspan=9 |
|-  style="background:#fbb;"
| 2010-10-27 || Loss ||align=left| Buckjoe Kiatchuchai ||  || Ubon Ratchathani, Thailand || Decision || 5 || 3:00 
|-  style="background:#cfc;"
| 2010-09-24 || Win ||align=left| Tuantong Pumphanmuang || Pumphanmoung Fight, Lumpinee Stadium || Bangkok, Thailand || Decision || 5 || 3:00
|-  style="background:#c5d2ea;"
| 2010-08-31 || Draw ||align=left| Tuantong Pumphanmuang || Pumphanmuang Fight, Lumpinee Stadium || Bangkok, Thailand || Draw || 5 || 3:00
|-  style="background:#fbb;"
| 2010-08-03 || Loss ||align=left| Pansak Look Bor Kor || Petchyindee Fights, Lumpinee Stadium || Bangkok, Thailand || Decision || 5 || 3:00 
|-  style="background:#cfc;"
| 2010-07-16 || Win ||align=left| Aranchai Kiatpatrpan || Fairtex Fight, Lumpinee Stadium || Bangkok, Thailand || KO (Left Elbow) || 3 || 1:58 
|-  style="background:#fbb;"
| 2010-06-01 || Loss ||align=left| Pansak Look Bor Kor || Siangsawangpanpa Fight, Lumpinee Stadium || Bangkok, Thailand || Decision || 5 || 3:00 
|-  style="background:#cfc;"
| 2010-03-12 || Win ||align=left| Panpecht Ch. N. Patalung || Petchyindee Fights, Lumpinee Stadium || Bangkok, Thailand || Decision || 5 || 3:00 
|-  style="background:#cfc;"
| 2010-01-30 || Win ||align=left| Anuwat Kaewsamrit || La Nuit des Titans, Final || Tours, France || Decision (Unanimous) || 3 || 3:00 
|-
! style=background:white colspan=9 |
|-  style="background:#cfc;"
| 2010-01-30 || Win ||align=left| Fabio Pinca || La Nuit des Titans, Semi Final || Tours, France || Decision || 4 || 3:00 
|-  style="background:#fbb;"
| 2009-12-24 || Loss ||align=left| Yodtuanthong Wiramanokul || CP Freshmart Marathon Tournament, Quarter Final || Thailand || Decision || 3 || 3:00 
|-  style="background:#cfc;"
| 2009-12-04 || Win ||align=left| Jaenrop Sakhomsil || Paianun Fight, Lumpinee Stadium || Bangkok, Thailand || Decision || 5 || 3:00 
|-  style="background:#cfc;"
| 2009-11-13 || Win ||align=left| Attachai Longbeachgarden || Siangsawangpanpa Fight, Lumpinee Stadium || Bangkok, Thailand || TKO || 4 || 
|-  style="background:#fbb;"
| 2009-10-06 || Loss ||align=left| Attachai Longbeachgarden || Praianun Fight, Lumpinee Stadium || Bangkok, Thailand || Decision || 5 || 3:00 
|-  style="background:#fbb;"
| 2009-08-18 || Loss ||align=left| F-16 Rachanon || Paianun Fight, Lumpinee Stadium || Bangkok, Thailand || Decision || 5 || 3:00 
|-  style="background:#cfc;"
| 2009-07-24 || Win ||align=left| Wansotsai Sit Jor || Fairtex Fight, Lumpinee Stadium || Bangkok, Thailand || TKO || 3 || 
|-  style="background:#cfc;"
| 2009-06-12 || Win ||align=left| Payasua Gardenseaview || Paianun Fights, Lumpinee Stadium || Bangkok, Thailand || Decision || 5 || 3:00 
|-  style="background:#cfc;"
| 2009-05-15 || Win ||align=left| Virayuthlek Himalaigym || Petchyindee Fights, Lumpinee Stadium || Bangkok, Thailand || Decision || 5 || 3:00 
|-  style="background:#cfc;"
| 2009-03-21 || Win ||align=left| Petchaiphum Bangkok2007 || Krikkrai Fights, Lumpinee Stadium || Bangkok, Thailand || Decision || 5 || 3:00 
|-  style="background:#cfc;"
| 2009-02-24 || Win ||align=left| Petchaiphum Por.Jaroenchai || Por. Pramuk Fight, Lumpinee Stadium || Bangkok, Thailand || Decision || 5 || 3:00 
|-  style="background:#fbb;"
| 2008-10-28 || Loss ||align=left| Palungtip Kor Sapaothong || Phetyindee Fights, Lumpinee Stadium || Bangkok, Thailand || Decision  || 5 || 3:00  
|-  style="background:#cfc;"
| 2008-09-03 || Win ||align=left| Saengartid Sor Sommay || Sor Sommay Fights, Lumpinee Stadium || Bangkok, Thailand || Decision  || 5 || 3:00  
|-  style="background:#fbb;"
| 2008-07-25 || Loss ||align=left| Weerayut Lookphetnoi || Prianan Fights, Lumpinee Stadium || Bangkok, Thailand || Decision  || 5 || 3:00  
|-  style="background:#fbb;"
| 2008-06-04 || Loss ||align=left| Dungkungwan Sor Jitpatthana || Sor Sommay Fights, Rajadamnern Stadium || Bangkok, Thailand || Decision  || 5 || 3:00
|-  style="background:#cfc;"
| 2008-04-02 || Win ||align=left| Natthapon Por Puanruamsang || Daorungprabat Fights, Rajadamnern Stadium || Bangkok, Thailand || Decision  || 5 || 3:00
|-  style="background:#cfc;"
| 2008-03-05 || Win ||align=left| Nawapon Por Puenruamsang || Daorungprabat Fights, Rajadamnern Stadium || Bangkok, Thailand || Decision  || 5 || 3:00  
|-  style="background:#cfc;"
| 2008-02-13 || Win ||align=left| Saeksan Or. Kwanmuang || Sor Sommay Fights, Rajadamnern Stadium || Bangkok, Thailand || Decision  || 5 || 3:00  
|-  style="background:#fbb;"
| 2007-12-13 || Loss ||align=left| Siankeng Jor Nopparat || Daorungprabat Fights, Rajadamnern Stadium || Bangkok, Thailand || Decision  || 5 || 3:00
|-  style="background:#cfc;"
| 2007-06-19 || Win ||align=left| Rangphet Phetcergus || Wanboonya Fights, Lumpinee Stadium || Bangkok, Thailand || Decision || 5 || 3:00  
|-  style="background:#cfc;"
| 2007-05-22 || Win ||align=left| Parinyachat Sitkamnanliew || Wanboonya Fights, Lumpinee Stadium || Bangkok, Thailand || Decision || 5 || 3:00 
|-  style="background:#fbb;"
| 2007-01-19 || Loss ||align=left| Nonthachailek Himalaigym || Wanboonya Fights, Lumpinee Stadium || Bangkok, Thailand || TKO  || 3 ||   
|-  style="background:#cfc;"
| 2006-12-26 || Win ||align=left| Wanday Phetsirigym || Phetpiya Fights, Lumpinee Stadium || Bangkok, Thailand || Decision || 5 || 3:00 
|-  style="background:#cfc;"
| 2006-12-02 || Win ||align=left| Chalawan Kor Sommay || Muaythai Lumpinee Krikkri Fights, Lumpinee Stadium || Bangkok, Thailand || Decision || 5 || 3:00 
|-  style="background:#cfc;"
| 2006-06-03 || Win ||align=left| Phetpoowiang Sitjomtri || Muaythai Lumpinee Krikkri Fights, Lumpinee Stadium || Bangkok, Thailand || Decision || 5 || 3:00 
|-  style="background:#cfc;"
| 2006-05-06 || Win ||align=left| Seanvised P.Pongsawang || Muaythai Lumpinee Krikkri Fights, Lumpinee Stadium || Bangkok, Thailand || TKO || 3 ||  
|-
| colspan=9 | Legend:

See also
List of male kickboxers

References

External links 
ONE Championship profile
Glory profile

1991 births
Living people
Lightweight kickboxers
Sitthichai Sitsongpeenong
Sitthichai Sitsongpeenong
Glory kickboxers
Kunlun Fight kickboxers
ONE Championship kickboxers
Kunlun Fight kickboxing champions